Tom Brown is a fictional character created by author Thomas Hughes in his work Tom Brown's School Days (1857) which is set at a real English public school—Rugby School for Boys—in the 1830s when Hughes himself had been a pupil there.  Tom Brown is based on the author's brother, George Hughes, and George Arthur is based on Arthur Penrhyn Stanley.

Tom Brown's Schooldays 
In Tom Brown's Schooldays, Tom Brown attends Rugby School after an epidemic means that he is unable to attend his local school in Berkshire. At Rugby, he befriends Harry "Scud" East, a slightly-senior boy, and falls afoul of the school bully, Flashman. Over the course of the novel, Brown changes from a timid boy to a brave young man who has overcome his initial fear of Flashman and his ilk.

In the 2005 television adaption, he was played by Alex Pettyfer.

Tom Brown at Oxford 
In the sequel novel, Tom Brown at Oxford, Brown is now attending Oxford University as his adventures continue, albeit without Scud East, who has since joined the army.

Other appearances
Tom Brown later appears in the historical novel Flashman's Lady (1977) by George MacDonald Fraser, in which he is reunited with his former rival, Harry Flashman, and invites him to a cricket game as an act of friendship. Flashman describes Tom's adult form as "...a giant of a man...like some boxer...".

Flashman made some passing references to Brown in earlier novels, referring to him as "East's odious friend" in Flashman at the Charge and during Flashman's recollection of his expulsion in Flashman.

Characters in British novels of the 19th century
Child characters in literature
Literary characters introduced in 1857